Neichülie-ü Nikki Haralu  (28 July 1918 – 2 September 2016) was an experienced Indian diplomat from Nagaland who served as Indian Ambassador to Panama, Costa Rica and Nicaragua  from 1978–80. She also served as Chairman, Nagaland State Social Welfare Advisory Board after her retirement from Indian Foreign Service.

Biography
Haralu was born in Kohima, in the then Naga Hills District to Dr. Harielungbe Haralu. She received her schooling in Kohima and Shillong. She graduated from the Scottish Church College, Calcutta University in 1948. She went on to complete her master's degree in Haverford, US in the year 1953.

References

Naga people
1918 births
India
India
Ambassadors of India to Panama
2016 deaths
Place of death missing
Scottish Church College alumni
People from Kohima
Indian women ambassadors